is a 1998 anime OVA series created by Oji Hiroi (of Sakura Wars fame) and Yasuhiro Imagawa and produced by AIC and Beam Entertainment. A video game sequel was released in 1999 for the PlayStation console.

Plot summary
The series takes place after the end of the first World War circa the 1930s, where virgin young women who have a special energy called Virgin Energy are called upon to pilot fighter jets who rely on Virgin energy. The story follows Shiokaze Umino as she attends the Nakano Women's Naval Academy with her classmates Satsuki and Komachi as they balance being on-duty and their regular school life.

Characters

Media

Episodes
The OVAs consisted of three episodes released from April 25 to October 25, 1998 and were released on VHS, Laserdisc, and DVD by Beam Entertainment. The OVAs were licensed in North America by Central Park Media and released under the U.S. Manga Corps label on VHS and DVD in 2000. The English dub was produced by Headline Studios in Irvington, New York.

Music
Opening Aitsu Performed by Sumi Shimamoto

Closing Virgin Fleet Go! Go! Performed by Sumi Shimamoto, Satsuki Yukino, Chinami Nishimura

References

External links

1999 video games
Alternate history video games
Anime International Company
Bishōjo games
Central Park Media
Military fiction
PlayStation (console) games
PlayStation (console)-only games
Red Entertainment games
Steampunk video games
Tactical role-playing video games
Video games developed in Japan
Video games set in the 1930s